Marshall Curry (born ) is an Oscar-winning American documentary director, producer, cinematographer and editor. His films include Street Fight, Racing Dreams, If a Tree Falls: A Story of the Earth Liberation Front, Point and Shoot, and A Night at the Garden. His first fiction film was the Academy Award-winning short film The Neighbors' Window (2019).

Life and career
Curry grew up in Summit, New Jersey, graduating from Summit High School in 1988. He attended Swarthmore College, graduating in 1992 with a major in comparative religion. He was also a Jane Addams Fellow at Indiana University’s Center on Philanthropy. Before becoming a filmmaker, Curry worked as senior producer at Icon Nicholson, a New York multimedia design firm.

Curry's first film, Street Fight, was released in 2005 and was nominated for an Academy Award in 2006. The film received a 100% fresh rating from Rotten Tomatoes. It was called "extraordinary" by David Denby (The New Yorker), and was described as "vastly entertaining" by John Anderson of Variety, and "filmmaking of the first order" by Scott Foundas of LA Weekly. That year he was named one of "25 New Faces in Independent Film" by Filmmaker Magazine and received the Donnet Award for Emerging Filmmaker by the International Documentary Association.

In 2009, his second film, Racing Dreams, won Best Documentary at the 2009 Tribeca Film Festival, where it was also runner up for the Audience Award. It received a 100% fresh rating from Rotten Tomatoes. The film was called "The best film of the year" by The Los Angeles Times and "one of the rare documentaries you leave wishing it was a little longer" by The New York Times.

In 2011, If a Tree Falls: A Story of the Earth Liberation Front won the award for Best Documentary Editing at the 2011 Sundance Film Festival, was theatrically released by Oscilloscope Laboratories and earned Curry his second Academy Award nomination. Kenneth Turan of The Los Angeles Times called it "one of the best documentaries of the year" and The New York Times described it as "an extraordinary documentary... [a] fearless exploration of complexity in a world drawn to oversimplified depictions of events and problems, heroes and villains."

In 2014, Curry's film Point and Shoot won Best Documentary at the 2014 Tribeca Film Festival and was released theatrically by The Orchard. The film was given an "A" grade by John Anderson of Indiewire, who said it was "a virtual swashbuckler". It was called "brilliantly constructed and provocative" by Peter Keough of The Boston Globe, "riveting... an extraordinary and quietly disturbing film" by David Rooney of The Hollywood Reporter, and Jay Weissberg of Variety said the "editing is a standout."

In 2017, Curry released the Academy Award nominated short film A Night at the Garden, a documentary about a 1939 German American Bund rally at Madison Square Garden, which attracted 20,000 Nazi supporters. Curry said of the film, "It tells a story about our country that we’d prefer to forget."

Curry's first narrative, the short film, The Neighbors' Window, premiered at the Tribeca Film Festival in April 2019. It won the Best Live Action Short Film at the 92nd Academy Awards.

Curry lives in Brooklyn, New York.

Filmography

Awards

Street Fight
Academy Award, Best Documentary Feature (nominee)
Emmy Award, Outstanding Continuing Coverage of a News Story: Long Form (nominee)
Tribeca Film Festival, Audience Award (winner)
Hot Docs Film Festival, Audience Award (winner)
Hot Docs Film Festival, Best International Documentary (winner)
AFI/Discovery Silverdocs Film Festival, Audience Award (winner)
Ashland Independent Film Festival, Best Documentary (winner)
WatchDocs Human Rights International Film Festival, Audience Award (winner)
Chicago International Film Festival, Award for Excellence in Television (winner)
Cine, Golden Eagle Award (winner)
IDA, Jacqueline Donnet Filmmaker Award (winner)
IDA, Distinguished Documentary Achievement Award (nominee)
Writers Guild of America Award for Best Documentary Screenplay (nominee)
American Library Association, VRT Notable Videos

Racing Dreams

Tribeca Film Festival, Best Documentary (winner)
Nashville Film Festival, Best Documentary (winner)
Florida Film Festival, Audience Award for Best Documentary Feature (winner)
Indianapolis International Film Festival, Audience Award (winner)
Chicago International Film Festival, Silver Hugo Award (winner)
Jacksonville Film Festival, Best Documentary (winner)

If a Tree Falls: A Story of the Earth Liberation Front

Academy Award, Best Documentary Feature (nominee)
Sundance Film Festival, Best Documentary Editing (winner)
Dallas International Film Festival, Environmental Visions Award (winner)
Miami International Film Festival, Knight Dox Competition Grand Jury Prize (nominee)
Miami International Film Festival, Knight Dox Competition Special Mention (winner)
Nashville Film Festival, Best Documentary (winner)
Traverse City Film Festival, Founders Award for Best Documentary (winner)
Santa Cruz Film Festival, Earthvision Environmental Jury Prize (winner)
Flagstaff Mountain Film Festival, Best Feature (winner)
Creative Capital Award, Moving Image

Point and Shoot
Tribeca Film Festival, Best Documentary Feature (winner)
 Emmy Award, Outstanding Graphic Design & Art Direction (nominee)
Gotham Award, Best Documentary Feature (nominee)
IDA Documentary Award, Best Documentary Feature (nominee)
Cinema Eye Honors, Outstanding Achievement in Editing (nominee)
Independent Film Festival Boston, Special Jury Prize (winner)
Little Rock Film Festival, Special Jury Prize for Courage in Filmmaking (winner)

A Night at the Garden
Academy Award, Best Documentary Short (nominee)

The Neighbors' Window
Academy Award, Best Live Action Short (Winner)
Palm Springs Shorts Fest, Best Live Action Short (Winner - Audience Award)
Casting Society Artios Awards - Short Film Casting (nominee)
Traverse City Film Festival, Best Fiction Short (Winner - Audience Award)
Hollyshorts Film Festival, Best Drama (Winner)
SCAD Savannah Film Festival, Best Narrative Short (Winner)
St. Louis International Film Festival, Best of the Fest (Winner)
Nashville Film Festival, Best Narrative Short (Winner)
Rhode Island Film Festival, Best Live Action Short (Winner) 
Woodstock Film Festival, Best Short Film (Winner)

References

External links

Marshall Curry website
Marshall Curry on Twitter
Street Fight website
Racing Dreams website
If A Tree Falls: A Story of the Earth Liberation Front website
Point and Shoot website

American documentary film directors
People from Summit, New Jersey
People from Brooklyn
Living people
Year of birth missing (living people)
Swarthmore College alumni
Film directors from New York City
Film directors from New Jersey
Summit High School (New Jersey) alumni
Directors of Live Action Short Film Academy Award winners